Ruth is an impact crater on Venus.

References

Impact craters on Venus